Eacles masoni is a moth of the  family Saturniidae. It is found from Mexico, south to Ecuador and Colombia.

Subspecies
Eacles masoni masoni
Eacles masoni tyrannus
Eacles masoni fulvaster

External links
 Images
 Records for Colombia

Ceratocampinae
Moths described in 1896